The Quarterly was an avant-garde literary magazine founded and edited by Gordon Lish in 1987. It was published by Vintage Books / Random House in New York City. The Quarterly showcased the work of contemporary authors. The magazine contained fiction, poetry and commentary. It ceased publication in 1995.

Volume 1 of The Quarterly was published in Spring 1987. "The Magazine of New American Writing" featured works by: Amy Hempel, Tom Spanbauer, Matthew Levine, Jane Smiley, Jack Gilbert, Harold Brodkey, Patty Marx and others.

Volume 2 of The Quarterly was published in Summer 1987. "The Magazine of New American Writing" featured works by: Noy Holland, Mark Richard, Nancy Lemann, Ann Pyne, Jack Gilbert, Paulette Jiles, Rick Bass and others.

Volume 3 of The Quarterly was published in Fall 1987. "The Magazine of New American Writing" featured works by: Mark Richard, Hellen Schulman, Ted Pejovich, Sunny Rogers, Ann Pyne, Diane Williams, Rick Bass and others.

Volume 4 of The Quarterly was published in Winter 1987.  "The Magazine of New American Writing" featured works by: Sharon Dupree, Mark Richard, Michael Hickins, Yannick Murphy, Patrick McGrath, Jan Pendleton, Rebecca Bondor, George Angel, Stephen O'Connor and others.

Volume 5 of The Quarterly was published in Spring 1988. "The Magazine of New American Writing" featured works by: Jennifer Allen, William Tester, Janet Mitchell, Sharon Dupree, Robert Fox, Sheila Kohler and others.

Volume 6 of The Quarterly was published in Summer 1988. "The Magazine of New American Writing" featured works by: Ann Pyne, Jan Pendleton, Victor Barall, Jennifer Allen, Harold Brodkey, M. D. Stein and others.

The Quarterly ended with the final publication of volume 31 in the Fall of 1995.

References

1987 establishments in the United States
1995 disestablishments in the United States
Quarterly magazines published in the United States
Avant-garde magazines
Defunct literary magazines published in the United States
Fiction magazines
Magazines established in 1987
Magazines disestablished in 1995